Nathan Steinberner (born 11 March 1977) is a former Australian rules footballer who played with Port Adelaide in the Australian Football League (AFL).

Steinberner, originally from Tanunda, in the Barossa Valley, was picked up by Port Adelaide from the Central District Football Club, as a zone selection. An on-baller, he played just once in their inaugural league season and also played only one game in 1998. He made 11 appearances in 1999, most in the second half of the season. Over the next two years he added just seven more games to his tally.

He was a member of five premiership teams at Central District, in 2000, 2001, 2003, 2004, 2005. In the 2004 SANFL Grand Final, Steinberner won the Jack Oatey Medal, awarded to the best on ground. He was club captain in 2006, but missed most of the year with injury, including the grand final loss to Woodville-West Torrens.

Steinberner is now a teacher at Thomas More College.

References

1977 births
Australian rules footballers from South Australia
Port Adelaide Football Club players
Port Adelaide Football Club players (all competitions)
Central District Football Club players
Living people
People from Tanunda, South Australia